Sammy Speakman (born 27 January 1934) is an English footballer, who played as a winger in the Football League for Tranmere Rovers. He also played for Wigan Athletic in the 1956–57 Lancashire Combination season, scoring 12 goals in 32 games.

References

Tranmere Rovers F.C. players
English Football League players
Wigan Athletic F.C. players
Middlesbrough F.C. players
Association football wingers
1934 births
Living people
People from Huyton
English footballers